Oiseaux exotiques (Exotic birds) is a piece for piano and small orchestra by Olivier Messiaen. It was written between 5 October 1953 and 3 January 1956 and was commissioned by Pierre Boulez. It is dedicated to Yvonne Loriod, the composer's wife.

Premiere 
This piece was first performed at the Théâtre du Petit Marigny by Yvonne Loriod and the ensemble Domaine musical, conducted by Rudolf Alberth.

Orchestral setting 
Piano, piccolo, 2 flutes, oboe, 2 Bb clarinets, clarinet in E-flat, bass clarinet, bassoon, 2 French horns, trumpet, and 6 percussionists playing glockenspiel, xylophone, chimes, cowbell, three gongs, snare drum, tam-tam, temple blocks, and wood block.

The work 

The birdsongs in this piece are from Asia and the Americas: the southern hill myna, the golden-fronted leafbird, the Baltimore oriole, the greater prairie chicken, the northern mockingbird, the catbird, the Indian robin, the white-crested laughingthrush, the american robin (entrusted to the two clarinets), the Swainson's thrush, the hermit thrush, the red-whiskered bulbul and the wood thrush.

Hindu rhythms 

Decî-Tâlas of ancient India, Cârngadeva system: Nihcankalîla, Gajalîla, Laksmîca, Caccarî, Candrakâla, Dhenkî, Gajajhampa, and karnâtic theory: Matsya-Sankirna, Triputa-Miśra, Matsya-Tiśra, Atatâla-Cundh.

Greek rhythms 

Composed feet by the metre: Typistlo-Epitrite; verses by the metre: lambelegiac, logaedic verses: Asclepiad, Saphique, Glyconic, Aristophanian, Phalaean, Peregrinean.

Duration 
The piece lasts about 16 minutes.

Recording 
Michael Thompson (French horn), London Sinfonietta (Orchestra), Paul Crossley (piano) (+ Des Canyons aux étoiles..., Couleurs de la Cité céleste) CBS Records, 1989, Angelin Chang (piano) and Cleveland Chamber Symphony) New European Recordings, won the 2007 GRAMMY for Best Instrumental Soloist(s) Performance (with orchestra).

See also 
 List of compositions by Olivier Messiaen

References

External links 
 
 , ensemble oktopus für musik der moderne, piano solo: , conductor: Konstantia Gourzi
 

Oiseaux exotiques
1956 compositions
Music dedicated to family or friends